= California Academy of Tauromaquia =

American Bullfighting School

The California Academy of Tauromaquia is a school of instruction for toreo, or Spanish style bullfighting, based in San Diego. Founded in 1996 by Coleman Cooney, it describes itself as the first school of its kind in the United States.
